Sandra Segal Ikuta (born June 24, 1954) is a United States circuit judge of the United States Court of Appeals for the Ninth Circuit.

Background 
Ikuta was born and raised in Los Angeles, California. She completed an Artium Baccalaureus degree at the University of California, Berkeley in 1976, having previously attended Stanford University for two years. Ikuta received a Master of Science degree in journalism from Columbia University in 1978. From 1978 to 1985 she was a writer and editor for many magazines and organizations which include Guilford Press, City National Bank, Unique Publications, and Disney Channel Magazine. 

Ikuta then attended the UCLA School of Law, where she was an editor of the UCLA Law Review. She graduated in 1988 with a Juris Doctor degree and Order of the Coif honors. Ikuta clerked for Ninth Circuit Judge Alex Kozinski from 1988 to 1989 and for United States Supreme Court Justice Sandra Day O'Connor from 1989 to 1990. She became an associate of the law firm O’Melveny & Myers in 1990 and went on to become a partner in 1997. At the time of her nomination, Ikuta had been general counsel of the California Resources Agency since January 2004, "trying to 
protect natural resources and open space and preserve agricultural land." She is a former alternate director of the Pacific Forest and Watershed Lands Stewardship Council.

Federal judicial service 
Ikuta was nominated to the Ninth Circuit by President George W. Bush on February 8, 2006, to fill the seat vacated by Judge James R. Browning, who assumed senior status in 2000. Previously, Carolyn Kuhl had been nominated to that position, but she had been filibustered by Senate Democrats for a year until December 2004 when she withdrew her nomination. Ikuta worked alongside her former boss, Judge Alex Kozinski, for whom she clerked. He testified on her behalf at the Senate Judiciary Committee hearing on her nomination. Ikuta was voted unanimously out of the Senate Judiciary Committee on May 26, 2006, and the U.S. Senate confirmed her nomination on June 19, 2006 by a 81–0 vote. She was the sixth judge appointed by Bush to the Ninth Circuit. She received her commission on June 23, 2006.

Notable cases 
Ikuta's first published opinion on the Ninth Circuit was United States v. Baldrich, issued on December 27, 2006.

She wrote the Dukes v. Wal-Mart dissent in the Ninth Circuit, with reasoning that largely ended up being adopted by the Supreme Court.

In May 2017, Ikuta dissented when the narrowly divided en banc circuit found that the United States District Court for the Southern District of California's policy of indiscriminately shackling criminal defendants in all pretrial hearings violated the Constitution's Due Process Clause.  In March 2018, the circuit's judgment was vacated by the unanimous Supreme Court of the United States.

City of Los Angeles v. Barr (Sanctuary Cities) 
On July 12, 2019, in City of Los Angeles V. Barr, the United States Court of Appeals for the Ninth Circuit overturned a nationwide injunction issued in 2018, thus upholding preferential treatment in awarding community policing grants to cities that cooperate with immigration authorities. In the opinion, Judge Ikuta wrote, "Cooperation relating to enforcement of federal immigration law is in pursuit of the general  welfare, and meets the low bar of being germane to the federal interest in providing the funding to "address crime and disorder problems, and otherwise... enhance public safety... one of the main purposes for which” the grant is intended. In her dissent,  Judge Kim Wardlaw wrote, "[The Department of Justice's] decision to implement  both  the  illegal  immigration  focus  area  and  the  Cooperation Certification is foreclosed by the text, structure, and purpose of the Community Policing Act."

State of California v. Alex Azar 

On February 24, 2020, Ikuta wrote the majority opinion upholding the Trump Administration rule withholding Title X funding from health-care providers that perform, promote, or support abortion with patients. The en banc Ninth Circuit sided with the government by a 7–4 vote. The majority acknowledged they knew that the gag rule's main purpose was to stop abortions; it nevertheless remained constitutional. The majority relied on the Supreme Court precedent Rust v. Sullivan, which upheld a nearly identical rule during the presidency of Ronald Reagan. Ikuta was joined by Senior Judge Edward Leavy and Judges Jay Bybee, Consuelo Callahan, Milan Smith, Eric Miller, and Kenneth K. Lee. Leavy was appointed by President Ronald Reagan, Bybee, Callahan, Ikuta, and Smith by President George W. Bush, and Miller and Lee by President Trump.

John Doe v. San Diego Unified School District 

On December 4, 2021, Ikuta dissented when a 2-1 majority declined to block San Diego Unified School District's requirement that students be vaccinated by December 20.

Statistics

Judge Ikuta sat on 26 en banc panels between December 2014 and August 2020. During that time, Ikuta was the en banc court's most frequent dissenter. The judges most likely to agree with Ikuta were Judges Callahan and Bea, while the judges most likely to disagree with her were Judges Thomas, McKeown, and W. Fletcher.

Federalist Society 
Judge Ikuta is an active member of The Federalist Society, a conservative and libertarian organization which holds panels, debates, and discussions, and she has been known to attend their national events.

See also 
List of law clerks of the Supreme Court of the United States (Seat 8)

References

External links 

Attorney Sandra S. Ikuta Nominated to Ninth Circuit Court of Appeals – February 9, 2006
Ikuta's Resume – from the Department of Justice  Office of Legal Policy
United States v. Baldrich (first precedential opinion authored by Ikuta)

1954 births
21st-century American judges
20th-century American Jews
American lawyers
Columbia University Graduate School of Journalism alumni
Judges of the United States Court of Appeals for the Ninth Circuit
Law clerks of the Supreme Court of the United States
Living people
United States court of appeals judges appointed by George W. Bush
University of California, Berkeley alumni
UCLA School of Law alumni
21st-century American women judges
Federalist Society members
21st-century American Jews